The 2009 CONCACAF Gold Cup knockout stage began with the quarterfinals on July 18 and concluded on July 26 with the Final at Giants Stadium in East Rutherford, New Jersey.

Overall

Quarter-finals 

The quarter-finals opened with a double-header at Lincoln Financial Field in Philadelphia on July 18. The first match featured Canada and Honduras. The nightcap featured the United States and Panama.

The remaining two quarter-final matches were played the next day, again as a double-header, at Cowboys Stadium in Arlington, Texas; being the first match featured by Guadeloupe and Costa Rica; and Mexico and Haiti featuring the nightcap.

Canada vs Honduras

United States vs Panama

Guadeloupe vs Costa Rica

Mexico vs Haiti

Semi-finals 

The two semi-final matchups were played as a double-header at Soldier Field in Chicago on July 23. The first match featured Honduras and hosts United States; the nightcap featured Costa Rica and Mexico.

Honduras vs United States

Costa Rica vs Mexico

Final

United States vs Mexico

References 

Knockout Stage